Christopher Neil Fraser (born July 1974) is a British-born Australian businessman. Born in the UK and brought up in Australia, Fraser was an investment banker, before becoming chief executive (CEO) of Sirius Minerals.

Fraser was born in Yeovil, Somerset, England, and his family emigrated to Australia when he was five weeks old.
He has a bachelor's degree in Commerce from the University of Western Australia.

Fraser worked in banking, particularly mining finance, with Rothschild, KPMG and Citigroup, rising to managing director in 2008. He has been the CEO of Sirius Minerals since January 2011.

He was involved in taking Sirius Minerals to near-bankruptcy in September 2019 before being acquired by Anglo-American.

Fraser and his family moved to North Yorkshire from Australia in 2012.

References

1974 births
Australian chief executives
Living people
People from Yeovil
University of Western Australia alumni